Luz María Valdivieso Ovalle (born July 1, 1977) is a Chilean actress.

Early life

Luz María Valdivieso Ovalle was born in Santiago, Chile. She went to study at Colegio Institución Teresiana and later entered the University of Chile to study psychology for two years. While at the university she realized that she wanted a career in acting. She put her career on hold to try her luck at the School of Teatro de Gustavo Meza and by the end of the first year of theater, she decided to stay there.

Television career

Her first telenovela was in Piel Canela (Cinnamon-toned skin), as Anita Moreno. Next she played her first antagonistic role, Estefania, in the telenovela Buen Partido (Good game), alongside Cristián Arriagada, a complicated moment for the drama division of Channel 13.

Later TVN asked for her to join the new telenovela Juvenil 16, where she played an impulsive girl named Alejandra.

After Juvenil 16, she joined the cast of the first night-time telenovela Ídolos (Idols), where she played a young rebel named Natalia Medina. It involved a love conflict with her father, played by Eduardo Barril, and her best friend. Her acting skills brought her much attention. Following Ídolos, she joined the cast of Juvenil 17 y later, the second night-time telenovela Los Treinta (The Thirties) playing Simona, a married woman who decides to leave her husband (Álvaro Espinoza) and her son in order to regain her liberty.

Her notoriety gained here a role in a major telenovela on TVN named Versus, playing her second antagonistic role as Vanesa Carrera, a young girl who fights for the love of Octavio Cox (Cristián Arriagada).

She went on to make special appearances in the night-time series Disparejas (Different) as Javiera, a woman who represents Francisco Pérez-Bannen.

Movie career

Valdivieso's first film role came in 2004 in a film called  No me toques (Don't touch me), along with Carmen Gloria Bresky, Sebastian Layseca, Francisca Lewin, Juan Pablo Ogalde and Benjamín Vicuña; under the direction of Mauro Bravo.

Her second film role came in La remolienda (The binge) which was released in 2007.

Personal life

She is married to Marcial Tagle, who acts in the series Casado con Hijos on MEGA.

Filmography

Theater
H (Hiroshima Mon Amour)
Los Borrachos
De Ratones y de Hombres
La Caida de la Casa Usher
Top Dogs
Tres Noches de un Sábado

External links
Especial de Luz Valdivieso en TVN

Chilean stage actresses
Chilean television actresses
Chilean telenovela actresses
1977 births
Chilean film actresses
Actresses from Santiago
Living people
Chilean people of Asturian descent